"Água de Beber" ("Water To Drink") is a bossa nova jazz standard composed by Antônio Carlos Jobim and originally recorded in the key of A minor, with lyrics written by Vinícius de Moraes. The English lyrics were written by Norman Gimbel.

The story is, as told by Kléber Farias, one of the engineers who helped build Brasília: In 1959, when the new capital was being built, the President of Brazil, Juscelino Kubitschek, invited Antônio Carlos "Tom" Jobim and Vinícius de Moraes to spend a season at Catetinho (the provisional presidential palace, made of wood) to compose a symphony that would be performed at the inauguration of Brasília.

One evening, Vinícius and Tom were walking near the wooden palace when they heard the noise of the water. They asked the watchman, "But what is that noise of water here?"  The watchman replied, "Você não sabe não? É aqui que tem água de beber, camará." [Don't you know? This is where you have drinking water, buddy boy.]

At that moment, they learnt both the source of water and inspiration for the first song composed in Brasília. Kléber was one of the first to hear the song, sung by Tom and Vinícius at the city's only hotel, hours after composing it.

Recordings

Vinícius de Moraes - Philips 78 rpm (1961)
Maysa - Canção do Amor mais Triste (1962)
Antônio Carlos Jobim - The Composer of Desafinado, Plays (1963) and The Wonderful World of Antonio Carlos Jobim (1965)
Astrud Gilberto (with Jobim) - The Astrud Gilberto Album (1965)
Sérgio Mendes - Herb Alpert Presents (1966)
La Lupe (with Tito Puente) - Tú y Yo (1965)
Frank Sinatra (with Jobim) - Sinatra & Company (1969)
Juan García Esquivel - The Genius of Esquivel (1967)
Al Jarreau - Glow (1976)
Ella Fitzgerald - Ella Abraça Jobim (1981) and Ella A Nice, Pablo, (1971)
Astrud Gilberto (plus James Last and his orchestra) (1986)
Joseph Portes (merengue rhythm) - Agua de beber (1988)
Eliane Elias - Eliane Elias Plays Jobim (1989)
Lee Ritenour - A Twist of Jobim (1997, various artists)
Charlie Byrd - My Inspiration: Music of Brazil (1999)
   Quarteto Jobim Morelenbaum - Quarteto Jobim Morelenbaum (2000)
Sophie Milman - Sophie Milman (2004)
Meja - Mellow (2004)
Ana Paula Lopes - Meu (2005)
Tania Maria - Intimidade (2005)
David Benoit - Full Circle (2006)
Bernie Worrell - Standards (2011)

See also
 List of bossa nova standards

References

 Bet E & Stef - Jazz/Bossa Nova (2002)

Bossa nova songs
Brazilian songs
Frank Sinatra songs
Portuguese-language songs
Songs with music by Antônio Carlos Jobim
Songs with lyrics by Vinicius de Moraes
1963 songs